Lemuel Hawkins (October 2, 1895 – August 10, 1934) was an American first baseman in Negro league baseball. He played for the Kansas City Monarchs, Chicago Giants and Chicago American Giants from 1921 to 1928. He was 5'10" and weighed 185 pounds.

Early life

Hawkins was born in Macon, Georgia, in 1895. He served in World War I and was also the first baseman for the successful 25th Infantry Wreckers baseball team posted at Schofield Barracks at Wahiawa, Hawaii  and  Ft. Huachuca, Arizona. He, along with teammates Oscar Johnson, Dobie Moore, Bullet Rogan, and Bob Fagin, joined the Kansas City Monarchs in the early 1920s.

Career
Hawkins was the Monarchs' everyday first baseman from 1921 to 1927 and played for the Monarchs  team which won the 1924 Colored World Series. According to George Sweatt, Hawkins and teammate Bill "Plunk" Drake were good friends. "[They] were the craziest guys," Sweatt recalled. "When we'd go to a different town, they'd just walk through the halls all night, fooling around. That's all they did!" Between the 1923 and 1924 baseball seasons, it was reported that Hawkins spent the winter driving a taxicab.

Hawkins played for the Chicago American Giants in 1928. He finished his career in the Negro National League with a .265 batting average, three home runs, and 268 runs scored in 2,126 plate appearances.

Later life and legacy
In July 1931, Hawkins was with three other men in a car when they were searched by police in connection with a holdup. One of the other men pulled a gun and was shot to death by the officers, and Hawkins was held on an automobile theft charge.

In August 1934, Hawkins and a partner attempted to hold up a beer truck. A scuffle took place, and Hawkins was accidentally shot to death by his partner.

Hawkins is one of four Negro league baseball players who were honored with plaques at Luther Williams Field in Macon in 2016.

References

External links
 and Seamheads

1895 births
1934 deaths
Chicago Giants players
Kansas City Monarchs players
Chicago American Giants players
Sportspeople from Macon, Georgia
Deaths by firearm in Illinois
20th-century African-American sportspeople
United States Army personnel of World War I